The Passover massacre was a suicide bombing carried out by Hamas at the Park Hotel in Netanya, Israel on 27 March 2002, during a Passover seder. Thirty civilians were killed in the attack and 140 were injured. It was the deadliest attack against Israelis during the Second Intifada.

The attack

During the Jewish holiday of Passover in 2002, Park Hotel in the Israeli coastal city of Netanya held its traditional annual Passover seder for its 250 guests, in the hotel dining room located at the ground floor of the hotel.

On the evening of 27 March 2002, a Palestinian bomber,  (or Abd Al-Baset Odeh), disguised as a woman approached the hotel carrying a suitcase which contained powerful explosives. The suicide bomber managed to pass the security guard at the entrance to a hotel, then he walked through the lobby passing the reception desk and entered the hotel's crowded dining room.

At 19:30 (GMT+2) the suicide bomber detonated the explosive device he was carrying. The force of the explosion instantly killed 28 civilians and injured about 140 people, of whom 20 were injured severely. Two of the injured later died from their wounds. Some of the victims were Holocaust survivors.

Most of the victims were senior citizens (70 and over). The oldest victim was 90 and the youngest was 20 years old. A number of married couples were killed, as well as a father together with his daughter. One of the victims was a Jewish tourist from Sweden who was visiting Israel for Passover.

Seventy-three of the 140 injured in the attack were evacuated to Laniado Hospital in neighboring Kiryat Sanz, Netanya. Although established as a regional hospital, Laniado had established a trauma center and emergency protocol in the wake of suicide bombings and terrorist attacks in the Netanya area during the Second Intifada. In addition to medical teams, the hospital benefited from the volunteerism of Hasidim living in Kiryat Sanz, who donated blood, carried stretchers, and otherwise assisted the medical staff.

According to the indictment filed in the Tel Aviv court, the initial plot for the Passover massacre included the use of cyanide; 4 kg of cyanide had been bought and prepared for a chemical attack. Tarak Zidan had been recruited to Hamas, and during 1997 he researched the use of chlorine and other nerve agents to be used in terror attacks. In 2002, 4 kg of chlorine had been bought and packed for the attack. For unknown reasons it was not used and passed to  instead.

Hamas response 
Hamas claimed responsibility for the attack. Hamas spokesman Usama Hamdan said that "This is a trial (attempt) to send a letter, to send a message, to all the world that we are trying to fight for our own freedom against a terrorist government in Israel led by Sharon" and that Israelis "have to expect those attacks from everywhere, from every Palestinian group." Another Hamas spokesperson Abdel Aziz Rantisi said "[a]s long as there is occupation, there will be a resistance" and denied that the attack was timed to coincide with the peace initiative of the Saudi government at the Beirut Summit, an initiative rejected by Hamas.

Official reactions

Israel 

Israeli government spokesman Gideon Meir related to the attack saying "what we had tonight was a Passover massacre" and added "There is no limit to Palestinian barbarism."

Palestinian Authority 
Palestinian Authority officials "strongly condemned" the attack. Palestinian President Yasser Arafat personally ordered the arrests of militants associated with Hamas, Islamic Jihad, and the Al Aqsa Martyrs Brigades as a response.

During a television broadcast on the Palestinian TV channel, Arafat praised the Palestinian people for the current popular uprising against Israel, but stressed that "We are against killing civilians on both sides".

Saudi Arabia 
Saudi Crown Prince Abdullah condemned it, while also commenting that "I will add to this by saying to the Israeli people that if their government stopped its methods of violence and destruction, and agreed to real peace, we will not hesitate in accepting that Israel live in peace with the rest of the nations in the region."

United Nations 
Kofi Annan, United Nations Secretary General stated that he condemned suicide bombings against Israeli civilians as morally repugnant.

United States 
President of the United States George W. Bush condemned the attack and called on Yasser Arafat and the Palestinian Authority to do everything in their power to stop the terrorist killing.

US Secretary of State Colin Powell stated that the bombing set the peace process back but vowed to continue.

Aftermath

Diplomacy
In his response to the Arab Peace Initiative adopted at the Arab League's summit in Beirut, Foreign Affairs Minister of Israel Shimon Peres noted that "... the details of every peace plan must be discussed directly between Israel and the Palestinians, and to make this possible, the Palestinian Authority must put an end to terror, the horrifying expression of which we witnessed just last night in Netanya."

Israeli retaliation

The attack was perceived in Israel as the high point of a bloody month in which more than 135 Israelis, mostly civilians, were killed in terror attacks.

Following the Passover massacre attack the Israeli government declared a state of emergency, ordered the immediate recruitment of 20,000 reservists in an emergency call-up, and in the following day launched the large-scale counter-terrorism operation Operation Defensive Shield in the West Bank which took place between 29 March and 10 May.

Qeis Adwan, head of the suicide bombing network responsible for the massacre, was killed by IDF forces on 5 April 2002 during Operation Defensive Shield, after the IDF and the Yamam caught him in Tubas, some 70 kilometers north of Jerusalem. An armored IDF Caterpillar D9 bulldozer toppled the house where he was hiding, after he was given a chance to surrender and refused.

Arrests and killings of perpetrators
One of the two chief planners of the attack, Qais Adwan, a Hamas member who was involved in numerous attacks in which a total of 77 people were killed, was killed in a shootout with the IDF during Operation Defensive Shield. In May 2002, Israeli forces arrested the other chief planner, . On 22 September 2005, al-Sayed was convicted of the Passover attack and also of ordering the May 2001 bombing of a Netanya mall. He received 35 life sentences for each murder victim and additional time for those who were wounded.

Fathi Khatib, who transported the bomber to his target, Mohand Sharim, who financed the operation and helped hide the bomber, Muammar Abu Sheikh, who recruited the bomber to Hamas and transferred the explosive belts used in the attack to an explosives expert for examination, and Nasser Yatiya, who helped transport the explosive belts, were tried and convicted together in an Israeli military court in April 2003 and handed 29 life sentences. Nasser Yatiya was released in the Gilad Shalit prisoner exchange in 2011. Muhammad Taher, who prepared the explosive charges, was killed in a clash with Israeli Shayetet 13 naval commandos in June 2003.

On 26 March 2008 Hamas commander Omar Jabar, suspected of helping organize the attack, was arrested in Tulkarem by IDF troops of the Nahshon Battalion. In March 2013 he was convicted over his role and sentenced to 30 years in prison.

In September 2009, Muhammad Harwish, a senior Hamas militant and a planner of the Passover Massacre, was arrested by the Border Police's elite Yamam counter-terror squad in his home village along with an aide, Adnan Samara.

Soccer Championship tournament 
In 2003, the Palestinian Authority sponsored a soccer tournament, Tulkarm Shahids Memorial Soccer Championship Tournament of the Shahid , describing the perpetrator as a "shahid" ("martyr").

71% of Palestinians polled about the tournament approved of naming it in honor of the bomber.

See also
 List of massacres in Israel
 List of terrorist incidents, 2002
 List of Hamas suicide attacks
 Battle of Jenin (2002)
 Israeli casualties of war
 Palestinian political violence

References

External links
 Passover suicide bombing at Park Hotel in Netanya – 27 March 2002 – published at the Israeli Ministry of Foreign Affairs
 "Alleged Passover massacre plotter arrested", CNN, 26 March 2008.
 "Hotel blast survivors relive the Passover massacre" The Daily Telegraph 29 March 2002
 US President George W Bush "This cold blooded killing must stop", 27 March 2002
 Israeli Government spokesman Gideon Meir "Palestinian violence knows no boundaries", 27 March 2002

Suicide bombings in 2002
Israeli casualties in the Second Intifada
Suicide bombing in the Israeli–Palestinian conflict
Terrorist incidents in Israel in 2002
Massacres in 2002
Massacres in Israel
Massacres in Israel during the Israeli–Palestinian conflict
Terrorist attacks attributed to Palestinian militant groups
March 2002 crimes
March 2002 events in Asia
Hamas suicide bombings
Islamic terrorist incidents in 2002
Islamic terrorism in Israel
Passover